Ropica nodieri is a species of beetle in the family Cerambycidae. It was described by Pic in 1945.

References

nodieri
Beetles described in 1945